The Australia national indoor lacrosse team represents Australia at indoor lacrosse. It is governed by Australian Lacrosse Association. They are currently ranked 8th in the world. The team is a full member of the Federation of International Lacrosse. The next major event for the team will be the 2019 FIL World Indoor Lacrosse Championship, to be held in Langley, BC, Canada.

See also
 Lacrosse in Australia
 Australia women's national lacrosse team

References

Indoor